Conus sennottorum, common name Sennett's cone, is a species of sea snail, a marine gastropod mollusk in the family Conidae, the cone snails and their allies.

Like all species within the genus Conus, these snails are predatory and venomous. They are capable of "stinging" humans, therefore live ones should be handled carefully or not at all.

Distribution
Locus typicus: "Off Campeche, Yucatan, Mexico."

This species occurs in the Caribbean Sea and in the Gulf of Mexico., from West Florida to Venezuela.

Description 
The maximum recorded shell length is 46 mm.

Type material
"Holotype and paratypes in United States National Museum, Washington. Also paratypes in collection Sennott. 
The holotype and one paratype were figured by Clench (1953: pl. 185, figs 1,2) and Abbott (1974: 255, fig. 2786)."

Habitat 
Minimum recorded depth is 26 m. Maximum recorded depth is 106 m.

References

 Rehder, H. A. and R. T. Abbott. 1951. Some new and interesting mollusks from the deeper waters of the Gulf of Mexico. Revista de la Sociedad Malacológica "Carlos de la Torre" 8: 53–66, pls. 8–9.
 Tucker J.K. & Tenorio M.J. (2009) Systematic classification of Recent and fossil conoidean gastropods. Hackenheim: Conchbooks. 296 pp.
  Puillandre N., Duda T.F., Meyer C., Olivera B.M. & Bouchet P. (2015). One, four or 100 genera? A new classification of the cone snails. Journal of Molluscan Studies. 81: 1–23

External links
 The Conus Biodiversity website
 Cone Shells – Knights of the Sea
 

sennottorum
Gastropods described in 1951